The 2016–17 Borussia Mönchengladbach season was the 117th season in the club's history.

Season overview

Background
Borussia Mönchengladbach finished fourth in the 2015–16 league season. This qualified them for the 2016–17 UEFA Champions League play-off round. They were eliminated 2015–16 edition of Champions League in the group stage, finishing fourth. They were also eliminated in the round of 16 of the DFB-Pokal by Werder Bremen.

Players

Squad

Transfers

In

Out

Friendly matches

Uhrencup

Osnabrück Football Summer

Competitions

Overview

Bundesliga

League table

Results summary

Results by round

Matches

DFB-Pokal

UEFA Champions League

Play-off round

Group stage

UEFA Europa League

Knockout phase

Round of 32

Round of 16

Statistics

Appearances and goals

|-
! colspan=14 style=background:#dcdcdc; text-align:center| Goalkeepers

|-
! colspan=14 style=background:#dcdcdc; text-align:center| Defenders

|-
! colspan=14 style=background:#dcdcdc; text-align:center| Midfielders

|-
! colspan=14 style=background:#dcdcdc; text-align:center| Forwards

|-
! colspan=14 style=background:#dcdcdc; text-align:center| Players transferred out during the season

Goalscorers

Last updated: 20 May 2017

Clean sheets

Last updated: 5 April 2017

Disciplinary record

Last updated: 20 May 2017

References

Borussia Mönchengladbach seasons
Borussia Mönchengladbach
Borussia Mönchengladbach
Borussia Mönchengladbach